Tamaroa may refer to:

Tamaroa (tribe), a tribe of Native Americans in the United States
Tamaroa, Illinois, a village in the United States
Tamaroa, Kiribati, a village in the Republic of Kiribati
 USCGC Tamaroa (1921), a United States Coast Guard Cutter
 USCGC Tamaroa (WMEC-166) (1935-1994), a United States Coast Guard Cutter
 SS Tamaroa (1921-1957), a British ocean liner of Shaw, Savill & Albion Line
 USCGC Tamaroa, several US Coast Guard ships with this name